Yevgeny Yevgenyevich Lovchev (born 6 August 1975) is a retired Russian-born Kazakhstani football midfielder.

His father Evgeny Lovchev also was a professional footballer.

References

Profile at club website

1975 births
Footballers from Moscow
Living people
Russian footballers
Kazakhstani footballers
Association football forwards
Kazakhstan international footballers
Kazakhstani expatriate footballers
Russian expatriate footballers
Expatriate footballers in Belarus
Expatriate footballers in Kazakhstan
Russian Premier League players
Kazakhstan Premier League players
FC Lokomotiv Moscow players
FC Slavia Mozyr players
FC Moscow players
FC Zhenis Astana players
FC Kairat players
FC Tobol players
FC Shakhter Karagandy players
FC FShM Torpedo Moscow players
FC Lokomotiv Saint Petersburg players